Ivan Deluca (born 28 July 1997) is an Italian ice hockey player for HC Bozen–Bolzano and the Italian national team.

He represented Italy at the 2019 IIHF World Championship.

References

External links

1997 births
Living people
Bolzano HC players
Italian ice hockey forwards
Sportspeople from Sterzing
Wipptal Broncos players
HC Pustertal Wölfe players